Verum Pechu Alla is a 1956 Indian Tamil-language film  directed by Joseph Pallipad. The film stars T. S. Balaiah and Padmini.

Plot
Maragatham is an innocent girl who grew up in a remote village. A zamindar sets eyes on her and she also yields to his passions dreaming that her child will be a Zamindar. But the zamindar deserted her. Maragatham's father pleaded with the zamindar to accept his daughter. The zamindar shot him dead. Maragatham became furious and vows in front of the zamindar that she will destroy him with the help of the child she is bearing. After 26 years Maragatham's son goes to take revenge from the zamindar. In the meantime, the zamindar is bringing up an adopted daughter. The young man falls in love with that girl. What happens next forms the rest of the story.

Cast
List adapted from the database of Film News Anandan.

Male cast
T. S. Balaiah
Nandaram
M. R. Sudharshan

Female cast
Padmini
S. Varalakshmi
Ragini

Production
The film was produced and directed by Joseph Pallipad. A. K. Velan and K. Paramanantham wrote the screenplay and dialogues. P. Ramasamy and V. G. Nair handled the cinematography. Sohanlal, Vembatti Satyam and Hiralal were in charge of choreography.

Soundtrack
Music was composed by C. N. Pandurangan while the lyrics were penned by Thanjai N. Ramaiah Dass, V. A. Gopalan and A. Maruthakasi. Playback singers are Jikki, (Radha) Jayalakshmi, U. R. Jeevarathinam, A. M. Rajah, Sirkazhi Govindarajan, S. C. Krishnan and K. R. Sellamuthu.

References

1950s Tamil-language films
Films scored by C. N. Pandurangan